HMS LST-414 was a United States Navy  that was transferred to the Royal Navy during World War II. As with many of her class, the ship was never named. Instead, she was referred to by her hull designation.

Construction
LST-414 was laid down on 18 October 1942, under Maritime Commission (MARCOM) contract, MC hull 934, by the Bethlehem-Fairfield Shipyard, Baltimore, Maryland; launched 21 November 1942; then transferred to the United Kingdom and commissioned on 19 January 1943.

Service history 
LST-414 saw no active service in the United States Navy.

At 03:35, 15 August 1943, LST-414 was struck by a torpedo off Cani Rocks, Tunisia. Capitano Carlo Faggioni, of the Regia Aeronautica (Italian Air Force), had flown his SM.79 torpedo bomber of the 278th Squadriglia, 132nd Gruppo, from Decimomannu Airfield in Sardinia. LST-414 was later beached off Bizerta.

She struck from the Navy list on 24 November 1943.

See also 
 List of United States Navy LSTs

Notes 

Citations

Bibliography 

Online resources

External links

 

Ships built in Baltimore
1942 ships
LST-1-class tank landing ships of the Royal Navy
World War II amphibious warfare vessels of the United Kingdom
S3-M2-K2 ships
Maritime incidents in August 1943